"CFYK-FM" was the previous call sign for what is now CBNY-FM, a repeater of CBU-FM Vancouver.

CFYK-FM is a Canadian radio station, broadcasting at 98.9 FM in Yellowknife, Northwest Territories. The station broadcasts the programming of the CBC Radio One network and locally produced programs.

CFYK was licensed in 1948 after an application by the Department of National Defence on behalf of the Royal Canadian Corps of Signals. It began operating in 1951 as a community radio station and was managed by civilian committee. It was turned over to the CBC in 1958.

Local programming

CFYK produces all of CBC Radio's local programs in the Northwest Territories, including The Trailbreaker on weekday mornings, the noon-hour program Northwind, Trail's End in the afternoon, and Northern Air on weekend mornings.

The station's afternoon programming also differs significantly from the rest of the network. Afternoon programming such as Q is pre-empted; instead, the station airs afternoon programming in First Nations languages.
CHAK in Inuvik, while airing the same regular local programming schedule as CFYK, produces a distinct schedule of First Nations programming in the afternoons.

Rebroadcasters
CFYK has the following rebroadcasters:

Relocations to FM
The CBC applied with the CRTC to convert the following AM transmitters to FM:

 On April 19, 2013, applied to convert CBQC 1230 to 98.9 MHz. The application was approved on September 19, 2013.
 On May 29, 2013, applied to convert CBDO 690 to 107.5 MHz. This application was approved on October 16, 2013.
 On January 16, 2017, applied to convert CBDI 860 to 97.9 MHz. The CRTC approved the application on March 17, 2017. The callsign was then changed to CFYK-FM-1.

CBQG is the last remaining low-power AM transmitter to rebroadcast CFYK-FM.

Community-owned rebroadcasters

Unlicensed rebroadcasters

Conversion to FM
On July 10, 2012, the CBC applied to move CFYK to 98.9 MHz, which was approved on November 7, 2012. In addition, the new transmitter will broadcast at 5500 watts (up from the proposed 1200 watts) on a non-directional antenna, with its effective height of antenna above average terrain increasing from 46.6 metres to 50 metres. In addition, the station will carry the CFYK-FM callsign, which has been used for a local repeater of Vancouver's CBC Music outlet, CBU-FM, at 95.3 MHz; that repeater was renamed CBNY-FM after CFYK moved to FM.

See also
 CFYK-DT
 CBU-FM Vancouver, repeated locally by CBNY-FM

References

External links
 CBC North
 Northwest Territories Frequency Listings Radio One
 

Fyk
Fyk